Daniel F. Burnham (February 8, 1864 – March 25, 1957) was an American farmer, educator, newspaper editor, and politician.

Born on a farm near Waupaca, Wisconsin, Burnham went to University of Wisconsin and taught school. He was elected Waupaca County Superintendent of Schools. In 1908, Burnham purchased the newspaper: the Waupaca Republican and later the Waupaca Post. In 1929 and 1931, Burnham served in the Wisconsin State Assembly and was a Republican.

Notes

1864 births
1957 deaths
People from Waupaca, Wisconsin
University of Wisconsin–Madison alumni
Editors of Wisconsin newspapers
Educators from Wisconsin
Farmers from Wisconsin
Republican Party members of the Wisconsin State Assembly